Chakyl Pfeiffer Camal (born 18 March 1990, in Mbabane, Swaziland) is an Australian-Mozambican Entrepreneur, swimmer specializing in freestyle. He competed in the 50 m event at the 2008 and 2012 Summer Olympics.

He was awarded a scholarship to study Business Administration at Macquarie University in Sydney. He also holds an Associate Degree in Business and Property from ICMS.

He is one of the co-founders of the Australian Conglomerate Panthera Group.

Social initiatives 
Chakyl and Martina founded the Panthera Charitable Foundation (PCF) in 2018 after cyclone Idai to support countries which have been affected by natural disasters.

PCF is "supported by a strong team of volunteers both locally and internationally PCF’s project in Mozambique continues to provide villages with the most essential and practical goods to restore normality, whilst keeping these clothes, shoes, books and other items out of landfills, which continue to contribute towards the impact of climate change."

References

External links
 

1990 births
Living people
Mozambican male freestyle swimmers
Olympic swimmers of Mozambique
Swimmers at the 2008 Summer Olympics
Swimmers at the 2012 Summer Olympics